Bedford St Johns is one of two railway stations in Bedford in Bedfordshire, England, on the Marston Vale Line linking  and . It is unstaffed and is operated by London Northwestern Railway.

St Johns was Bedford's first station, on the Varsity Line (the original Oxford to Cambridge line). Its role diminished following the closure of that line, leaving it with a truncated route to Bletchley. British Rail closed the original station on 14 May 1984 and diverted services from Bletchley along a new chord line (on which the current St Johns station is now situated) to Bedford Midland station when a new bay platform was opened.

Services
The station is served by London Northwestern Railway local services from Bletchley to Bedford via the Marston Vale Line, using Class 230 multiple units.

Monday to Saturdays, there is generally an hourly service to Bletchley (westbound) and to Bedford Midland (eastbound) with no Sunday service.

Community Rail Partnership
In common with others on the Marston Vale Line, the station is covered by the  Marston Vale Community Rail Partnership, which aims to increase use of the line by involving local people.

History

Opening
The station was opened in November 1846 by the Bedford Railway as the eastern terminus of its line from Bletchley, the first line to reach the town. The station was on the west side of the A600 London Road, with the main station buildings on the south side of the line facing the public house. The goods yard was further west nearer the River Great Ouse to receive river traffic. A second connecting line to the goods yard created a triangle which diverted drainage to produce a pond which supplied the station and small two-road locomotive shed.

1875 accident

A second station was opened in Bedford in 1857 on the Midland Railway's  to  line. The route chosen by the Midland took it across the earlier line at a point near the Bletchley end of the triangle, and a level crossing was built. In March 1875, a Midland passenger train collided with the rear coaches of a Bedford service, killing one passenger and injuring four others. The subsequent enquiry identified a badly-positioned Bedford starter signal as a major cause of the accident. To remedy the problem a 29-lever signal box was opened in 1877 to control new interlocked signals, and block signalling was introduced throughout the Bedford line, which had been extended to Cambridge.

Decline and relocation

Although the Second World War saw the Oxford-Cambridge line handle unprecedented levels of traffic, it suffered from a lack of investment in the post-war years. The 1955 Modernisation Plan proposed improvements to the line, believing it could be a strategic cross-country route for freight across three British Railways regions without having to pass through London. The policy was however to change within a few years, leaving the Bletchley Flyover as a testament of the change of course. The first attempt to close the line came in 1959, but was unsuccessful in the face of local opposition. Hopes for the line thereafter rose when it did not figure in the Beeching Report, but it was nevertheless proposed for closure in 1964, with the Oxford — Bletchley and Bedford — Cambridge routes closing after the last day of service on 30 December 1967.

The Bletchley - Bedford route, now known as the Marston Vale Line, survived in a downgraded form as freight facilities were withdrawn and the stations became unstaffed halts. The station, now a terminus, came under the authority of then area manager at Bedford Midland. By March 1971 the main station buildings and water tower had been demolished, leaving it as a terminus halt. A third attempt to close the line in 1972 was resisted by the Bedford Rail Users' Association.

In 1984, a replacement station was opened in the former freight yard, at the north end of the triangle, which enabled services to continue to Bedford Midland. The new connection runs over the route of the Midland's Hitchin line, which closed in 1964. The old station site was abandoned, although some of the furniture, such as the lampposts, was not removed. The site has now been reclaimed by nature.

Future
East West Rail is seeking to reinstate the entire  to  route. Following a consultation process in 2019, the Company's preferred route between Bedford and Cambridge continues to use the current route via St Johns onto the Midland Main Line, then north via Bedford Midland before turning east towards  (rather than following the old Varsity Line alignment through the original Bedford St Johns station site). In March 2021, plans were unveiled which, if taken forward, would see Bedford St Johns railway station relocated as the track through the station will be realigned.

References

Sources

External links

Buildings and structures in Bedford
Railway stations in Bedfordshire
DfT Category F2 stations
Former London and North Western Railway stations
Railway stations in Great Britain opened in 1846
Railway stations in Great Britain closed in 1984
Railway stations opened by British Rail
Railway stations in Great Britain opened in 1984
Railway stations served by West Midlands Trains
Transport in Bedford
1846 establishments in England
East West Rail